ISRG may refer to:

 Intuitive Surgical (NASDAQ: ISRG), manufacturer of robotic surgical systems
 Internet Security Research Group, public-benefit corporation that focuses on Internet security
 Information Security Research Group, research group of computer scientists and mathematicians